Abdellah Kechra (born January 31, 1945) is an Algerian former football player. He participated in the 1968 Africa Cup of Nations in Ethiopia, the first participation of Algeria team..

Honours

Club
 Won the Algerian Championnat National once with MC Oran in 1971
 Won the Algerian Cup once with MC Oran in 1975

External links
 Abdellah Kechra statistics - dzfootball

1945 births
Living people
Footballers from Oran
1968 African Cup of Nations players
Algerian footballers
Algeria international footballers
ASM Oran players
MC Oran players
MC Oran managers
Association football defenders
Algerian football managers
21st-century Algerian people